Manuel Hernán Machuca Berríos (6 June 1924 –  27 February 1985) was a Chilean football defender who played for Chile in the 1950 FIFA World Cup. He also played for Colo-Colo.

References

External links
FIFA profile

1924 births
1985 deaths
Chilean footballers
Chile international footballers
Association football defenders
Colo-Colo footballers
1950 FIFA World Cup players
Footballers from Santiago